Fritz Cäsar Baumann (3 May 1886, Basel – 9 October 1942, Basel) was a Swiss painter who worked primarily in the Expressionist and Cubist styles. Preoccupation with caricature, textile and pottery, puppet theater and book illustration.

Biography
From 1904 to 1907, he completed an apprenticeship in decorative painting. This was followed by a study trip to Rome with August Babberger. Upon his return, he studied at the Academy of Fine Arts, Munich. He then moved to the mountain village of Rührberg, near Grenzach, where he created drypoint etchings. 

In 1909, he married Anny Rickenbach, daughter of a gunsmith from Muttenz. Shortly after, he went to Karlsruhe to study with Hans Thoma and improve his etching techniques. After the birth of his son Fritzli in 1910, the family lived in Erlenhof (Thürnen) but spent the winters in Paris working at La Ruche, an artists' residence. After a stay there in 1912, he began to focus almost exclusively on woodcuts. For a time, he was obsessed with creating portraits of his son. In 1913, they moved to Berlin, where he became a member of Der Sturm, an artists' group associated with the journal of the same name. 

Anny died in May 1914. To suppress his grief, he volunteered for military service and was assigned as a Gefreiter to a Pionier-Kompanie in Ticino. It was there he met his second wife, Emma Ziswyler. He continued to exhibit his woodcuts, while in service, with the help of Herwarth Walden. Back in Basel, after the war, he became a teacher; at the Gewerbeschule and the Frauenarbeitsschule, a similar organization for women. He was also a cofounder of the artists' group Das Neue Leben, and wrote the group's manifesto:  

  

In the mid 1920s, he began to suffer from recurring bouts of depression and developed doubts about his artistic abilities. At some point, he took most of his important works from 1916 to 1920 and threw them in the Rhine. After 1928, he ceased exhibiting and focused almost entirely on teaching. He committed suicide in 1942.

Selected works

External links 

 Fritz Baumann – Leben und Werk, Website
 
 
 
 More works by Baumann @ ArtNet

Swiss male painters
20th-century Swiss painters
20th-century Swiss male artists
1886 births
1942 deaths
1942 suicides
20th-century Swiss military personnel
Suicides in Switzerland